Sheila May Tousey (born June 4, 1959) is a Native American actress.

Biography
Born in Keshena, Wisconsin in 1959, Tousey is a stage and film actress of Menominee and Stockbridge-Munsee descent. She was raised on both Menominee and Stockbridge-Munsee reservations. Tousey began dancing as a small child.

She did not perform on stage until she attended Albuquerque's University of New Mexico. She initially entered the university's law program, planning to specialize in federal contracts and Native American law, but later changed her major to English. At the time, she started taking theater arts courses. After graduating, Tousey enrolled in the graduate acting program at New York University's Tisch School of the Arts.  She directed her first play, An Evening at the Warbonnet, at the University of New Mexico in 1994.

Tousey has become a professional dancer and actress. Her first movie role was in Thunderheart (1992), and she appeared in Medicine River that same year. Her succeeding roles have been in a variety of characters, including appearances on Law & Order. Beginning in 2002, she has appeared in four movies adapted from Tony Hillerman mystery novels, which feature American Indians of the Southwest.

Filmography

References

External links
 
 

1960 births
Native American actresses
Living people
People from Keshena, Wisconsin
Actresses from Wisconsin
Menominee people
University of New Mexico alumni
20th-century Native Americans
21st-century Native Americans
20th-century Native American women
21st-century Native American women
Native American people from Wisconsin